Admir Aganović (born 25 August 1986) is a Bosnian former professional footballer who played as a striker.

Club career
Aganović came through the youth system of Partizan, but failed to make a first-team debut. He instead played on loan at Teleoptik in the Serbian League Belgrade, Dinamo Vranje in the Serbian First League, and Zemun in the Serbian SuperLiga. While in Serbia, Aganović also spent some time with fellow SuperLiga clubs Mladost Lučani and Čukarički.

In the 2009 winter transfer window, Aganović moved to Belgium and joined Belgian Pro League side Dender. He subsequently played for Swiss Super League club Neuchâtel Xamax and Romanian Liga I side Gaz Metan Mediaș. Between 2012 and 2016, Aganović played for three Swedish clubs, namely Syrianska, Assyriska FF, and Landskrona BoIS.

International career
On 1 June 2008, Aganović made his full international debut for Bosnia and Herzegovina in a 1–0 home friendly win over Azerbaijan, his sole international appearance.

Notes

References

External links
 
 
 
 
 

1986 births
Living people
People from Ugljevik
Association football forwards
Bosnia and Herzegovina footballers
Bosnia and Herzegovina youth international footballers
Bosnia and Herzegovina under-21 international footballers
Bosnia and Herzegovina international footballers
FK Partizan players
FK Teleoptik players
FK Dinamo Vranje players
FK Zemun players
FK Mladost Lučani players
FK Čukarički players
F.C.V. Dender E.H. players
Neuchâtel Xamax FCS players
CS Gaz Metan Mediaș players
Syrianska FC players
Assyriska FF players
Landskrona BoIS players
Serbian First League players
Serbian SuperLiga players
Belgian Pro League players
Swiss Super League players
Liga I players
Allsvenskan players
Superettan players
Bosnia and Herzegovina expatriate footballers
Expatriate footballers in Serbia
Bosnia and Herzegovina expatriate sportspeople in Serbia
Expatriate footballers in Belgium
Bosnia and Herzegovina expatriate sportspeople in Belgium
Expatriate footballers in Switzerland
Bosnia and Herzegovina expatriate sportspeople in Switzerland
Expatriate footballers in Romania
Bosnia and Herzegovina expatriate sportspeople in Romania
Expatriate footballers in Sweden
Bosnia and Herzegovina expatriate sportspeople in Sweden